Ips subelongatus, known generally as larch bark beetle or  oblong bark beetle, is a species of typical bark beetle in the family Curculionidae. It is considered near indistinguishable from Ips cembrae except for the species of tree it chooses as a host and through DNA analysis. The species of tree it dwells in are Larix sibirica, Larix gmelinii, Larix leptolepis and Larix gmelinii var. olgensis. The beetle is found in the Asian part of Russia,  China (Heilongjiang, Jilin and Liaoning provinces), Japan (Hokkaido and Honshu), the Korean peninsula and Mongolia.

References

Further reading
 
 Mamaev, B. M. "Borer pests of forests of Siberia and the Far East." Agropromizdat, Moscow (RU)(in Russian) (1985).

External links

 

Scolytinae